The Palatine Nos. 26 to 63 were steam locomotives of the Palatine Railways and typical express train, tender locomotives of the Crampton type with wheel arrangement 2A. Both running axles were housed in the main frame, the driving axle was behind the vertical boiler. This enabled driving wheels with a diameter of 1,830 mm to be fitted without placing the boiler higher than was customary at the time. As a further feature, the locomotive "Palatinate" had weather protection for the engine driver and stoker, which was not common at the time.

Fourteen units were made by Keßler (Maschinenfabrik Esslingen) and four by Maffei. The Maffei locomotives had the regulator housing in the middle of the boiler, a larger smokebox than those from Keßler, a smooth vertical boiler and steam chest arranged over the cylinder. The locomotives were equipped with Type 3 T 5 tender.

In 1925 the first example of the series, PFALZ was replicated in the Weiden repair shop. This replica is now on loan from the Nuremberg Transport Museum in the Neustadt/Weinstrasse Railway Museum.

External links 

4-2-0 locomotives
Transport in Rhineland-Palatinate
26–63
Railway locomotives introduced in 1853
Maffei locomotives
Standard gauge locomotives of Germany
Passenger locomotives
Esslingen locomotives